Tales of an Immoral Couple is a 2016 Mexican romantic comedy written and directed by Manolo Caro. The film stars Cecilia Suárez, Ximena Romo, Manuel García Rulfo, and Sebastián Aguirre.

Plot 
Lucio and Martina are two teens who meet during their first years at a private Catholic school in San Miguel de Allende. Discovering an  indescribable chemistry between them, they set out exploring their sexualities, falling deeper and deeper in love. The film tells their story in a series of flashbacks, with the actual plot taking place 25 years later after Martina and Lucio have been separated thanks to a scandal that ended their high school romance, but reunite thanks to a chance encounter in the street. The two then set about orchestrating fake spouses and families for themselves in order to impress the other, before a raucous dinner sets the record straight.

Cast 
 Cecilia Suárez as Martina
 Manuel García Rulfo as Lucio
 Sebastián Aguirre as Lucio 16 Years old
 Ximena Romo as Martina 17 Years old
 Natasha Dupeyrón as Amelia
 Eréndira Ibarra as Florentina Calle
 Javier Jattin as Balthazar
 Juan Pablo Medina as Igor
 Sofía Sisniega as Vilma
 Mariana Treviño as Beatriz
 Paz Vega as Loles
 Anilu Estevez as Beatriz 11 Years old
 Andrés Almeida as Vicente

References

External links 
 
 

2016 films
2010s Mexican films